James Madhlope Phillips (11 December 1919 – 22 October 1987)  was a South African artist.

1919 births
1987 deaths
South African artists